Robežnieki Parish is an administrative unit of  Krāslava Municipality, Latvia.

Towns, villages and settlements of Robežnieki parish 

Parishes of Latvia
Krāslava Municipality